Alcohol consumption in Russia remains among the highest in the world. According to a 2011 report by the World Health Organization, annual per capita consumption of alcohol in Russia was about 15.76 litres of pure alcohol, the fourth-highest volume in Europe. It dropped to 11.7 litres in 2016, dropping further to about 10.5 litres in 2019. Another general trait of Russian alcohol consumption pattern was the high volume of spirits compared with other alcoholic drinks (such as beer or red wine).

Russia currently implements a variety of anti-alcoholism measures (banning spirits and beer trade at night, raising taxes, banning the advertising of alcohol). According to medical officials, these policies have resulted in a considerable fall of alcohol consumption volumes, to 13.5 litres by 2013, with wine and beer overtaking spirits as the main source of beverage alcohol. These levels are comparable with European Union averages. Alcohol producers claim that falling legal consumption is accompanied by growth in sales of illegally produced drink.

High volumes of alcohol consumption have serious negative effects on Russia's social fabric and bring political, economic and public health ramifications. Alcoholism has been a problem throughout the country's history because drinking is a pervasive, socially acceptable behaviour in Russian society and alcohol has also been a major source of government revenue for centuries. It has repeatedly been targeted as a major national problem, with mixed results. Alcoholism in Russia has, according to some authors, acquired a character of a national disaster and has the scale of a humanitarian catastrophe.

History

Legend holds that the tenth-century Russian prince Vladimir the Great rejected Islam as a state religion for the country because of its prohibition of alcohol. Historically, alcohol has been tolerated or even encouraged as a source of revenue.

In the 1540s, Ivan the Terrible began setting up kabaks (кабак) or taverns in his major cities to help fill his coffers; a third of Russian men were in debt to the kabaks by 1648. By 1859 vodka, the national drink, was the source of more than 40% of the government's revenue.

20th century 

In 1909 average alcohol consumption was said to be 11 bottles per capita per year. An estimated 4% of the population of St. Petersburg were alcoholics in 1913.

At the beginning of World War I, prohibition was introduced in the Russian Empire, limiting the sale of hard liquor to restaurants.

After the Bolshevik Party came to power, they made repeated attempts to reduce consumption in the Soviet Union. However, by 1925, vodka had reappeared in state-run stores. Joseph Stalin reestablished a state monopoly to generate revenue. Alcohol-related taxes constituted one third of government revenues by the 1970s.

Soviet leaders Nikita Khrushchev, Leonid Brezhnev, Yuri Andropov, and Konstantin Chernenko all tried to stem alcoholism. Mikhail Gorbachev increased controls on alcohol in 1985; he attempted to impose a partial prohibition, which involved a massive anti-alcohol campaign, severe penalties against public drunkenness and alcohol consumption, and restrictions on sales of liquor. The campaign was temporarily successful in reducing per capita alcohol consumption and improving quality-of-life measures such as life expectancies and crime rates, but it was deeply unpopular among the population and it ultimately failed.

21st century 
In 2006, a new alcohol excise stamp known as the EGAIS system was introduced, allowing to identify every bottle sold in Russia through a centralized data system.

In 2010, Russian President Dmitry Medvedev nearly doubled the minimum price of a bottle of vodka in an effort to combat the problem.

In 2012, a national ban on sales of all types of alcoholic beverages from 11 p.m. to 8 a.m. was introduced to complement regional bans.

The Russian government has proposed reducing the state minimum price of vodka in reaction to the 2014–15 Russian financial crisis.

In December 2016, 78 people in Irkutsk died in a mass methanol poisoning. Medvedev reacted by calling for a ban on non-traditional alcoholic liquids like the bath lotion involved in this case, stating that "it's an outrage, and we need to put an end to this".

In recent years, alcohol-related deaths in Russia have dropped dramatically year over year falling to 6,789 in 2017 from 28,386 in 2006 and continuing to decline into 2018. Under Vladimir Putin, new restrictions have been imposed, and officials have discussed raising the legal drinking age from 18 to 21.

Impact

Demographic

A study by Russian, British and French researchers published in The Lancet scrutinized deaths between 1990 and 2001 of residents of three Siberian industrial towns with typical mortality rates and determined that 52% of deaths of people between the ages of 15 and 54 were the result of complications of alcohol use disorder. Lead researcher Professor David Zaridze estimated that the increase in alcohol consumption since 1987 has caused an additional three million deaths nationwide.

In 2007, Gennadi Onishenko, the country's chief public health official, voiced his concern over the nearly threefold rise in alcohol consumption over the past 16 years; one in eight deaths was attributed to alcohol-related diseases, playing a major role in Russia's population decline. Men are particularly hit hard: according to a U.N. National Human Development Report, Russian males born in 2006 had a life expectancy of just over 60 years, or 17 years fewer than western Europeans, while Russian females could expect to live 13 years longer than their male counterparts.

Economic
In 1985, at the time of Gorbachev's campaign to reduce drinking, it was estimated that alcoholism resulted in $8 billion in lost production.

Social

In the early 1980s, an estimated "two-thirds of murders and violent crimes were committed by intoxicated persons; and drunk drivers were responsible for 14,000 traffic deaths and 60,000 serious traffic injuries". In 1995, about three quarters of those arrested for homicide were under the influence of alcohol, and 29% of respondents reported that children beaten within families were the victims of drunks and alcoholics.

A 1997 report published in the Journal of Family Violence found that among male perpetrators of spousal homicide, 60–75% of offenders had been drinking prior to the incident.

Suicide 

In 2008, suicide claimed 38,406 lives in Russia. With a rate of 27.1 suicides per 100,000 people, Russia has one of the highest suicide rates in the world, although it has been steadily decreasing since it peaked at around 40 per 100,000 in the mid-late 1990s, including a 30% drop from 2001 to 2006.

Heavy alcohol use is a significant factor in the suicide rate, with an estimated half of all suicides a result of alcohol misuse. This is evident by the fact that Russia's suicide rate since the mid-'90s has declined alongside per capita alcohol consumption, despite the economic crises since then; alcohol consumption is more of a factor than economic conditions.

Treatment
Prophylactoriums, medical treatment centres, were established in 1925 to treat alcoholics and prostitutes. By 1929 there were five in Moscow.  Chronic alcoholics evading treatment were detained for up to two years.

From the 1930s and 1940s until the mid-1980s, the main treatment for alcoholism in Russia was conditioned response therapy. This treatment has since fallen out of favour, and the modern mainstream treatment has become pharmacotherapy, which involves detailed analyses of each patient, medicinal treatment, psychotherapy, sociotherapy, and other support. Alcoholics Anonymous exists in Russia, but is generally dismissed by the Russian population. Disulfiram has also seen widespread use.

One alternative therapy for alcoholism that has been used in Russia is the practice of "coding", in which therapists pretend to insert a "code" into patients' brains with the ostensible effect that drinking even small amounts of alcohol will be extremely harmful or even lethal. Despite not being recommended in Russian clinical guidelines, it has enjoyed considerable popularity. In recent years its use has lessened, due to the spread of information about its ineffectiveness.

See also
Russian Cross
Vodka Belt
List of federal subjects of Russia by incidence of substance abuse
List of countries by alcohol consumption per capita

References

Further reading
 .

 
Health in Russia
Alcohol abuse in Russia